Kach Diyan Wanga is a Punjabi serial on Alpha ETC Punjabi. Punjabi in the U.S. The show started on 11 July 2011 and was directed and written by Inderjeet, the director of the famous serial Amanat which starred Gracy Singh. This show was considered the launching pad of Surbhi Jyoti into mainstream Punjabi cinema and subsequently her worldwide fame after being selected to play the lead of Zoya Farooqui (later Zoya's twin daughters, Sanam and Seher) on Zee TV's critically and commercially acclaimed soap opera, Qubool Hai. Gul Khan the producer/director of Qubool Hai had contacted Surbhi to audition for the role of Zoya after seeing her pictures for the promotional stills of Kach Diyan Wanga.

Plot

Just The Beginning This is the story of a middle class Hindu - Punjabi family wanting to get their daughters married as soon as possible. Shibbo Anita Shabdeesh wants to get all three of her daughters married since they have become "jawan" or are in a marriageable age. She insists her husband Shavinder Mahal to look for a boy for her eldest daughter Pinky Prabjot Kaur. He isn't being to serious about it, so a friend of hers comes and talks about a relationship. Shibbo is happy to hear about this and insists on meeting the boy and his family that evening. She informs her husband about the short notice. That evening, the boy's family came over. They were eating snacks in the family room and Pinky's younger sisters Preet Surbhi Jyoti and Raji, the youngest out of the three who is handicapped noticed how the boy was eating the snacks. Their dad noted that too. They go outside with their father to discuss about this. He agrees with them. They tell Pinky about this and they try to come up with a plan for Pinky to avoid meeting the boy. Preet comes up with the idea of dressing her up ugly to scare the boy. They put ugly make up on her and covered her face with a veil. When the sisters asked the boy to open the veil, seeing Pinky's face frightened the boy. Preet and Raji start laughing as they leave, but their mom gets mad at them. She also talks with her husband about this. Her husband then becomes serious and decides to look for a groom for Pinky. Shibbo also reminds him to look for a good boy and hopes that what had happened to his sister Harnam Deepti wouldn't happen to Pinky. The next day, Preet tells her dad she has an interview for applying for a job and she needed him to drop her off to the city. He takes her in an old white 1970s car. Preet complains on how old and cheap the car looked, but her dad keeps telling her that this was the car he brought for her mom's "Bharat". On the way, the car gets stuck. After some time, a car stops and a man comes out of the car. He helps Balraj and he asks the boy if he could take Preet to the city for the interview. The boy stares at Preet and starts to like her. He agrees to take her. On the way, the both talked to each other and Preet complements him. After that day, he starts having dreams about Preet. The next couple days, Balraj starts looking for a boy for Pinky. Dharam Singh (Malkeet Rauni), a good friend of Balraj suggests a boy for them and both families meet each other. Balraj gives the picture of his daughter and the boy's mom complements about it. The same boy that took Preet to the interview came in the room.

Cast
Shavinder Mahal...Balraj Sehgal
Anita Shabdeesh...Shibbo Sehgal
Prabjot Kaur...Pinky Sehgal
Surbhi Jyoti...Preet Sehgal
Manpreet Singh Rajvanshi...Karan (Preet's love and Inder's best friend)
Rahul Jungral...Inder (Pinky's fiancé and Karan's best friend)
Satwant Kaur...Gurmeet
Malkeet Rauni...Dharam Singh
Deepti...Harnam (Balraj's sister)
B.N. Sharma...Deendayal
Charan Saini...Vicky
Ikkatar Singh...Vanjara
Gurpreet Kaur Raikot...Mindo (Preet's friend)
Lakha Lakhwinder Singh... Aman
Roopi maan - Bholi

2011 Indian television series debuts
Indian drama television series